In statistics, a record value or record statistic is the largest or smallest value obtained from a sequence of random variables. The theory is closely related to that used in order statistics.

The term was first introduced by K. N. Chandler in 1952.

See also

 Ladder height process
 MinHash

References

Further reading

 

Nonparametric statistics